Aethioprocris is a genus of moths of the family Zygaenidae.

Species
Aethioprocris congoensis Alberti, 1957
Aethioprocris togoensis Alberti, 1954

References
Aethioprocris at AfroMoths

Procridinae
Zygaenidae genera